The 2002–03 Pro Tour season was the eighth season of the Magic: The Gathering Pro Tour. On 24 August 2002 the season began with Grand Prix Sapporo. It ended on 10 August 2003 with the conclusion of the 2003 World Championship in Berlin. The season consisted of 21 Grand Prixs and 6 Pro Tours, held in Boston, Houston, Chicago, Venice, Yokohama, and Berlin. Also Master Series tournaments were held at four Pro Tours. At the end of the season Kai Budde was proclaimed Pro Player of the Year for the third time in a row.

Grand Prixs – Sapporo, London, Cleveland

GP Sapporo (24–25 August)
 Shinichi Kumagai
 Masahiko Morita
 Satoshi Nakamura
 Itaru Ishida
 Kenji Kimoto
 Junichi Kinoshita
 Yuta Hirosawa
 Nobuaki Shikata

GP London (31 August – 1 September)
 Jakub Slemr
 Christoph Hölzl
 Bram Snepvangers
 Craig Stevenson
 Pedro Velhinho
 Christophe Haim
 Dario Minieri
 Gérard Garcia

GP Cleveland (7–8 September)
 Valentin Moskovich
 Gabriel Tsang
 Jeremy Pinter
 Matthew Schrempp
 Adam Prosak
 Dave Williams
 Brian Davis
 Rob Dougherty

Pro Tour – Boston (27–29 September 2002)

Boston saw Phoenix Foundation win once again. This put all team members on top in regards to overall Pro Tour victories as no other player had then won more than two Pro Tours. The victory was dryly commented as not surprising anyone anymore.

Tournament data
Prize pool: $200,100
Players: 363 (121 teams)
Format: Team Sealed (Odyssey, Torment, Judgment) – first day, Team Rochester Draft (Odyssey-Torment-Judgment) – final two days
Head Judge: Nat Fairbanks

Top 4

Final standings

Pro Player of the year standings

Grand Prixs – Hamburg, Utsonomiya, Copenhagen, Philadelphia

GP Hamburg (28–29 September)
 Simon Hockwin
 Arndt Meier
 Jens Krause
 Patrick Plößer
 Nico Wendt
 Piotr Sienko
 Dennis Schmitz
 Jean Charles Salvin

GP Utsonomiya (12–13 October)
 Rei Hashimoto
 Shuhei Nakamura
 Tsuyoshi Fujita
 Masashi Oiso
 Eiji Nomura
 Masanori Kobayashi
 Jin Okamoto
 Junichi Kinoshita

GP Copenhagen (12–13 October)
 Bob Maher, Jr.
 Jens Krause
 Kai Budde
 Fredrik Boberg
 Dirk Baberowski
 Jens Thorén
 David Linder
 Fleurent Jeudon

GP Philadelphia (26–27 October)
 Jeff Cunningham
 Shaun Doran
 Eli Aden
 Morgan Douglass
 Nick Eisel
 Craig Krempels
 Patrick Sullivan
 Jacob Rabinowitz

Pro Tour – Houston (8–10 November 2002)

Pro Tour Houston featured the Extended format. The Ice Age and Mirage-blocks had just rotated out of the format along with 5th Edition, thus removing several of the former key cards from the format. Also Onslaught had become legal for Extended play shortly before the tournament. The most played deck was a "Reanimator"-deck that aimed to get a big creature into the graveyard early via .

His teammates of "Your Move Games" (YMG), Rob Dougherty and Darwin Kastle, came in second and third. Instead of breaking the format with one kind of deck the YMG players in the top 8 even played all different decks, thereby losing games exclusively to one another. It was Rob Dougherty's fifth final day appearance.

Jens Thorén from Sweden won the final of the Master Series against Gary Wise.

Tournament data
Prize pool: $200,130
Players: 351
Format: Extended
Head Judge: Rune Horvik

Top 8

Final standings

Winner's deck

Justin Gary's deck, named Turbo Oath, was designed to get a huge  into play with  quickly. The deck and sideboard was mainly blue, but also included black and green.

Masters – Booster Draft

Pro Player of the year standings

Grand Prixs – Melbourne, Los Angeles, Reims, New Orleans

GP Melbourne (23–24 November)
 Ben Seck
 Tristan Gall
 Jarron Puszet
 Shun Jiang
 Richard Grace
 Milton Jian Xiong Lin
 Chris Allen
 Jake Hart

GP Los Angeles (23–24 November)
 Philip Freneau
 Bob Maher, Jr.
 Brian Hegstad
 Ken Krouner
 Peter Swarowski
 Allen Sun
 Nick Eisel
 Gerardo Gordinez Estrada

GP Reims (30 November – 1 December)
 Alex Mack
 Benjamin Caumes
 Patrick Mello
 Emmanuel Vernay
 Hans Joachim Hoeh
 Régis Lavoisier
 Christoph Lippert
 Anton Jonsson

GP New Orleans (3–4 January)
 Zvi Mowshowitz
 Eugene Harvey
 Michael Pustilnik
 Diego Ostrovich
 Jeff Cunningham
 Morgan Douglass
 Carl Lobato
 Trey Van Cleave

Pro Tour – Chicago (17–19 January 2003)

In Chicago Kai Budde won his seventh Pro Tour. On his way to the title he defeated, William Jensen, Jon Finkel, and Nicolai Herzog, some of the most accomplished players in the game. Finkel had his tenth Top 8 showing, a feat matched even today only by Kai Budde and Paulo Vitor Damo da Rosa. In the Masters final Franck Canu defeated Ken Ho.

Tournament data

Players: 349
Prize Pool: $200,130
Format: Rochester Draft (Onslaught)
Head Judge: Mike Guptil

Top 8

Final standings

Masters – Standard

Pro Player of the year standings

Grand Prixs – Hiroshima, Sevilla, Boston

GP Hiroshima (25–26 January)
 Motokiyo Azuma
 Osamu Fujita
 Takao Higaki
 Kang Jisang
 Junichi Kinoshita
 Yoshitaka Nakano
 Tsuyoshi Fujita
 Atsushi Tabuchi

GP Sevilla (22–23 February)
 Anton Jonsson
 Carlos Romão
 Eivind Nitter
 Antoine Ruel
 Stan van der Velden
 Adriano Rohner
 David Brucker
 Javier Perez Fresnedo

GP Boston (22–23 February)
 Brian Kibler
 Matthew Cory
 Aaron Breider
 Mark Zajdner
 Ben Rubin
 Joshua Wagener
 Zvi Mowshowitz
 Eric James

Pro Tour – Venice (21–23 March 2003)

Osyp Lebedowicz won Pro Tour Venice with a white and red deck revolving around the Cycling mechanic. It was the second-most popular deck at the tournament trailing only the deck played by his opponent Tomi Walamies in the final. Walamies played a red deck with a Goblin theme. The Masters was won by the Japanese team "PS2".

Tournament data

Players: 310
Prize Pool: $200,130
Format: Onslaught Block Constructed (Onslaught, Legions)
Head Judge: Collin Jackson

Top 8

Final standings

Winner's decklist

Osyp Lebedowicz won the tournament with the following red and white deck revolving around the Cycling mechanism:

Masters – Team Rochester Draft

Pro Player of the year standings

Grand Prixs – Kyoto, Singapore, Prague

GP Kyoto (29–30 March)
 Akira Asahara
 Hisaya Tanaka
 Masashi Oiso
 Akihiro Takakuwa
 Itaru Ishida
 Shuhei Nakamura
 Ryouma Shiozu
 Yoshiaki Tashiro

GP Singapore (29–30 March)
 Mikael Polgary
 Terry Soh
 Kelvin Yew Teck Hoon
 Sam Lei Kang Lau
 Chang Chua
 Kai Cheong Tang
 Gary Talim
 Antonino De Rosa

GP Prague (12–13 April)
 Stefan Jedlicka
 Raphaël Lévy
 Thomas Gundersen
 David Jensen
 Jelger Wiegersma
 Gabriel Nassif
 Anton Jonsson
 Armin Birner

Pro Tour – Yokohama (9–11 May 2003)

Making the final eight for the third time this season Mattias Jorstedt won Pro Tour Yokohama. Jon Finkel also made another Top 8 appearance thus extending his lead in this category to eleven. In the final of the last Masters tournament Bob Maher, Jr. defeated Gabriel Nassif.

Tournament data

Players: 243
Prize Pool: $200,130
Format: Booster Draft (Onslaught-Legions)
Head Judge: Rune Horvik

Top 8

Final standings

Masters – Extended

Pro Player of the year standings

Grand Prixs – Pittsburgh, Amsterdam, Bangkok, Detroit

GP Pittsburgh (31 May – 1 June)
1. Illuminati
 Justin Gary
 Zvi Mowshowitz
 Alex Shvartsman
2. Prodigy
 James Duguid
 Charles Gindy
 Manny Orellana
3. Phoque Foundation
 Jean Charles Salvin
 Pasquale Ruggiero
 Jairo Liquidano
4. Northern Lights No. 5
 Justin Schneider
 Michael Krzywicki
 Mike Long

GP Amsterdam (7–8 June)
1. Rankko Bongo Wheshiwheshi
 Wilfried Ranque
 Carlos Romão
 Jose Barbero
2. Ace Ten Off
 Kamiel Cornelissen
 Jon Finkel
 Eric Froehlich
3. Object of Affection
 Tomi Walamies
 Jens Thorén
 Anton Jonsson
4. Boston Tea Party
 André Delere
 Rolf Ottovordemgentschenfelde
 René Kraft

GP Bangkok (12–13 July)
 Tsuyoshi Fujita
 Itaru Ishida
 Vincent Gan
 Osamu Fujita
 Masahiko Morita
 Tsutomu Yamada
 Peerapat Ekpoorthorn
 Noppadol Srirattana

GP Detroit (12–13 July)
 Bob Maher, Jr.
 Eugene Harvey
 Joshua Ravitz
 Alex Shvartsman
 Mark Herberholz
 Matt Severa
 Morgan Douglass
 Derek Starleaf

2003 World Championships – Berlin (6–10 August 2003)

German Daniel Zink won the 2003 World Championship, defeating Jin Okamoto from Japan in the finals. Kai Budde was declared Pro Player of the year for the third time in a row as none of his pursuers made significant points at this tournament. The United States won the national team competition, defeating Finland in the finals.

Tournament data
Prize pool: $208,130 (individual) + $213,000 (national teams)
Players: 309
Formats: Standard, Rochester Draft (Onslaught-Legions-Scourge), Extended
Head Judge: Rune Horvik

Top 8

Final standings

National team competition

  United States (Justin Gary, Gabe Walls, Joshua Wagner)
  Finland (Tomi Walamies, Tuomo Nieminen, Arho Toikka)

Pro Player of the year final standings

After the World Championship Kai Budde was awarded his fourth Pro Player of the year title.

References

Magic: The Gathering professional events